Tosena is a genus of cicadas from South-East Asia. They are the type genus of tribe Tosenini. Species formerly included in Tosena are Distantalna splendida, Formotosena montivaga, Formotosena seebohmi and Trengganua sibylla.

List of species
The Global Biodiversity Information Facility lists:
 Tosena albata Distant, 1878
 Tosena depicta Distant, 1888
 Tosena dives (Westwood, 1842)
 Tosena fasciata (Fabricius, 1787)
 Tosena melanoptera (White, 1846)
 Tosena mearesiana (Westwood, 1842)
 Tosena paviei (Noualhier, 1896)

References

External links
 A photo of Tosena paviei

Hemiptera of Asia
Taxa named by Jean Guillaume Audinet-Serville
Taxa named by Charles Jean-Baptiste Amyot
Tosenini
Cicadidae genera